Encore School for Strings, founded in 1985 by David and Linda Cerone, was the summer session of the Cleveland Institute of Music. It was located in Hudson, Ohio at the Western Reserve Academy.  Encore had no minimum age requirement, though a taped audition was used to screen applicants. The music faculty was world-renowned, with teachers from top U.S. music schools including the Cleveland Institute of Music, Curtis Institute of Music, and the Colburn School.

Notable alumni

Violin
Ivan Chan
Ray Chen
Robert Chen
Ellen de Pasquale
Laura Frautschi
Laura Frautschi
Hilary Hahn
Frank Huang
Judith Ingolfsson
Leila Josefowicz
Tamaki Kawakubo
Soovin Kim
Nicholas Kitchen
Nurit Pacht
Lara St. John
Scott St. John
Sheryl Staples
Elena Urioste
Jasper Wood

Cello
Zuill Bailey
Amir Eldan
Mirjam Ingolfsson
Jeffrey Lastrapes

Notable Past/Present Faculty 

Violin
Jascha Brodsky
David Cerone
Linda Sharon Cerone
Victor Danchenko
Bernhard Goldschmidt
Renata Artman Knific
Robert Lipsett
William Preucil
Stephen Rose
David Russell
David Updegraff

Viola
Jeffrey Irvine
Mark Jackobs
Stanley Konopka
Lynne Ramsey
Peter Slowik
Robert Vernon
Lawrence Wheeler

Cello
Richard Aaron
Orlando Cole
Margo Tatgenhorst Drakos
Desmond Hoebig
Eleonore Schoenfeld
Bruce Uchimura
Christopher von Baeyer
Alison Wells
Richard Weiss
Zvi Plesser

External links
Encore School for Strings

Music schools in Ohio
Cleveland Institute of Music